Beach Volleyball at the Lusophone Games was first held in the first edition in Macau, in 2006.

Men's tournament
2009:  José Pedrosa-Hugo Gaspar
2006:  Maciel/Costa

Women's tournament
2009:  Fabiane Boogaredt/Taiana Souza
2006:  Saldanha/Maestrini

 
Lusofonia Games
Sports at the Lusofonia Games
Lusophony Games